A hundred is the natural number following 99 and preceding 101.

Hundred may also refer to:

Units and divisions
 Hundred (word) formerly also equal to 120 or other values
 Hundred (unit) sometimes equal to 120 or other values
 Hundredweight (cwt.), the most common of these units
 Hundred (county division), a largely historical division of a county or similar larger administrative unit.

Places
 Hundred, West Virginia, US

Other uses
 Hundred (novel series), a Japanese light novel series
 Hundreds (video game), a 2013 puzzle video game
 "Hundred", a song by the Fray from How to Save a Life
 "Hundred", a song by Khalid from Free Spirit
 "Hundred", an episode of the TV series One Tree Hill
 Hundred (TV series), an Indian series by Hotstar
 The Hundred (cricket), a professional 100-ball cricket tournament in the UK, from summer 2021
 One Hundred Above the Park, a residential high-rise in St. Louis, Missouri, United States

See also
 100 (disambiguation)